Holi Lane, Ring Road, Shyamoli is a locality in Dhaka, the capital of Bangladesh. It is to the northwest of Agargaon, neighbour of the Kallyanpur.

Shaymoli is a busy area of Dhaka. The previous landmark Shyamoli Cinema is destroyed and recently a shopping mall has emerged on its place, named Shaymoli Square. It is the largest shopping mall of Shyamoli. There is also a new cine-complex instead of Shyamoli cinema hall.

References 

Geography of Dhaka